Solo Art Records is a U.S. based record label and was purchased by Rudi Blesh and Harriet Janis from the original owner in 1946 and run alongside their Circle label. It had issued recordings of solo jazz and blues piano on 78s. The label was sold with the Circle label to the George H. Buck Jr. Jazz Foundation Inc., located in New Orleans, Louisiana, in 1979.

Since George Buck's acquisitionof  the Solo Art label has remained dedicated to the presentation of solo performances of great jazz and blues pianists, now from the 1940s to the present.

Artists 
Jazz artists featured on Solo Art Records include:
 Albert Ammons
 Evan Christopher
 Lennie Felix
 Duke Heitger
 Eddie Higgins
 Milt Hinton
 Art Hodes
 Pete Johnson
 Tim Laughlin
 Meade Lux Lewis
 Cripple Clarence Lofton
 David Paquette
 Knocky Parker
 Steve Pistorius
 Luckey Roberts
 Bobby Rosengarden
 Ralph Sutton
 Joe Turner
 Dick Wellstood
 George Wettling
 Jimmy Yancey

External links 
 Solo Art Records at Jazzology (jazzology.com)

Jazz record labels